Spaceballs is an Amiga demogroup from Norway, originally based in the city of Halden. It was formed in 1987, but did not make its first release until 1989.

The group has released many demos, including State of the Art and Nine Fingers. The group is still active to this day, and is Norway's oldest existing demogroup.

Productions 
 State of the Art (winner of The Party, December 1992)
 Wayfarer (winner of The Gathering, 1992
 9 Fingers (4th at The Party, December 1993)

External links 

Group entry on Pouët
Group entry on CSDb

Demogroups